James L. Goodwin State Forest is a Connecticut state forest covering approximately  in the towns of Chaplin and Hampton. The lands became public property when James L. Goodwin donated the personal forest he had been developing since 1913 to the state in 1964.

Features
Ponds and trails
The forest encompasses  Pine Acres Lake and two smaller ponds,  Black Spruce Pond and  Brown Hill Pond, that are used for fishing and canoeing. The forest has  of trails for hiking, cross-country skiing, and horseback riding. Trails include sections of the blue-blazed Natchaug Trail and the Air Line State Park Trail.
Education center
The Goodwin Forest Conservation Education Center is an environmental education facility operated by the Connecticut Department of Energy and Environmental Protection in partnership with the Connecticut Forest and Park Association. Programs are offered for schools, the public, and educators. Forest management programs are also offered for landowners, foresters, loggers, and municipal-land-use commissioners. The site includes a wildlife garden, a small nature museum, the southern shore of Pine Acres Pond, and a youth group campsite.

Further reading
 A Journey to a Windswept Island in Goodwin State Forest, Peter Marteka, Hartford Courant, May 17, 2013.

References

External links

James L. Goodwin State Forest Connecticut Department of Energy and Environmental Protection
James L. Goodwin State Forest Map Connecticut Department of Energy and Environmental Protection
Friends of Goodwin Forest

Connecticut state forests
Parks in Windham County, Connecticut
Hampton, Connecticut
Chaplin, Connecticut
Nature centers in Connecticut
Protected areas established in 1964
1964 establishments in Connecticut